Chalcolepidius  is a genus of beetles in the family Elateridae.

List of species 

 Chalcolepidius albisetosus Casari, 2002
 Chalcolepidius albiventris Casari, 2002
 Chalcolepidius angustatus Candèze, 1857
 Chalcolepidius apacheanus Casey, 1891
 Chalcolepidius approximatus Erichson, 1841
 Chalcolepidius attenuatus Erichson, 1841
 Chalcolepidius aurulentus Candèze, 1874
 Chalcolepidius bomplandii Guerin-Meneville, 1844
 Chalcolepidius boucardi Candèze, 1874
 Chalcolepidius chalcantheus Candèze, 1857
 Chalcolepidius copulatuvittatus Casari, 2002
 Chalcolepidius corpulentus Candèze, 1874
 Chalcolepidius costatus Pjatakowa, 1941
 Chalcolepidius cyaneus Candèze, 1881
 Chalcolepidius desmaresti Chevrolat, 1835
 Chalcolepidius dugesi Candèze, 1886
 Chalcolepidius erythroloma Candèze, 1857
 Chalcolepidius eschscholtzi Chevrolat, 1833
 Chalcolepidius extenuatuvittatus Casari, 2002
 Chalcolepidius exulatus Candèze, 1874
 Chalcolepidius fabricii Erichson, 1841
 Chalcolepidius fasciatus Casari, 2002
 Chalcolepidius ferratuvittatus Casari, 2002
 Chalcolepidius fleutiauxi Pjatakowa, 1941
 Chalcolepidius forreri Candèze, 1886
 Chalcolepidius fryi Candèze, 1874
 Chalcolepidius gossipiatus Guerin-Meneville, 1844
 Chalcolepidius inops Candèze, 1886
 Chalcolepidius jansoni Candèze, 1874
 Chalcolepidius lacordairei Candèze, 1857
 Chalcolepidius lafargi Chevrolat, 1835
 Chalcolepidius lenzi Candèze, 1886
 Chalcolepidius limbatus Eschscholtz, 1829
 Chalcolepidius mexicanus Laporte, 1836
 Chalcolepidius mniszechi Candèze, 1881
 Chalcolepidius mocquerysi Candèze, 1857
 Chalcolepidius morio Candèze, 1857
 Chalcolepidius obscurus Laporte, 1836
 Chalcolepidius oxydatus Candèze, 1857
 Chalcolepidius porcatus (Linnaeus, 1767)
 Chalcolepidius proximus Casari, 2002
 Chalcolepidius pruinosus Erichson, 1841
 Chalcolepidius rodriguezi Candèze, 1886
 Chalcolepidius rostainei Candèze, 1889
 Chalcolepidius rubripennis LeConte, 1861
 Chalcolepidius rugatus Candèze, 1857
 Chalcolepidius serricornis Casari, 2002
 Chalcolepidius silbermanni Chevrolat, 1835
 Chalcolepidius smaragdinus LeConte, 1854
 Chalcolepidius spinipennis Casari, 2002
 Chalcolepidius sulcatus (Fabricius, 1777)
 Chalcolepidius supremus Casari, 2002
 Chalcolepidius tartarus Fall, 1898
 Chalcolepidius truncuvittatus Casari, 2002
 Chalcolepidius validus Candèze, 1857
 Chalcolepidius villei Candèze, 1878
 Chalcolepidius virens (Fabricius, 1787)
 Chalcolepidius virgatipennis Casari, 2002
 Chalcolepidius virginalis Candèze, 1857
 Chalcolepidius viridipilis (Say, 1825)
 Chalcolepidius viriditarsus Schwarz, 1906
 Chalcolepidius webbi LeConte, 1854
 Chalcolepidius zonatus Eschscholtz, 1829

References 

 
Elateridae genera